Brzeziny  is a village in the administrative district of Gmina Wielopole Skrzyńskie, within Ropczyce-Sędziszów County, Subcarpathian Voivodeship, in south-eastern Poland.

References

Brzeziny